Zerodium is an American information security company founded in 2015 with operations in Washington, D.C., and Europe. Its main business is developing and acquiring premium zero-day exploits from security researchers and reporting the research, along with protective measures and security recommendations to its government clients as part of the ZERODIUM Zero Day Research Feed. The company has reportedly more than 1,500 researchers and has paid more than $50,000,000 in bounties between 2015 and 2021.

History
Launched on July 25, 2015 by Vupen's founders (a French information security company), Zerodium was the first company to release a full pricing chart for zero-days ranging from $5,000 to $1,500,000 per exploit. The company was reported to have spent between $400,000 to $600,000 per month for vulnerability acquisitions in 2015.

In 2016, the company increased its permanent bug bounty for iOS exploits to $1,500,000.

Zerodium published a new pricing chart exclusively for mobile zero-days ranging from $10,000 to $500,000 per exploit in the year 2017. The company also announced a time-limited bounty of $1,000,000 for Tor browser exploits.

New products were added by the company in 2018 to its bounty program including cPanel, Webmin, Plesk, Direct Admin, ISP Config, OpenBSD, FreeBSD, and NetBSD. It also then increased its payouts for various software including a bounty of up to $500,000 for Windows remote code execution exploits.

In January 2019, Zerodium once again increased its bounties for almost every product including a payout of $2,000,000 for remote iOS jailbreaks; $1,000,000 for WhatsApp, iMessage, SMS, and MMS RCEs; and $500,000 for Chrome exploits.

Fast forward to September 2019, Zerodium increased its bounty for Android exploits to $2,500,000, and for the first time, the company is paying more for Android exploits than iOS. Payouts for WhatsApp and iMessage have also been increased. The company is reportedly spending between $1,000,000 to $3,000,000 each month for vulnerability acquisitions.

Its official website revealed that Zerodium has more than 1,500 researchers as of June 2021 and has launched additionally to its permanent bounties, a time-limited bug bounty program which aims to acquire other zero-day exploits that are not within Zerodium's usual scope or for which the company is temporarily increasing the payouts.

Criticism 
Reporters Without Borders criticized Zerodium for selling information on exploits used to spy on journalists to foreign governments.

See also
 Market for zero-day exploits

References

External links 
 

Computer security companies
American companies established in 2015
Computer security exploits
Companies based in Washington, D.C.
Cyberwarfare